A list of populated places in Adıyaman Province, Turkey by district:

Adıyaman

Ahmethoca, Adıyaman
Akdere, Adıyaman
Akpınar, Adıyaman
Akyazı, Adıyaman
Akçalı, Adıyaman
Akıncılar, Adıyaman
Alibey, Adıyaman
Ardıçoluk, Adıyaman
Atakent, Adıyaman
Aydınlar, Adıyaman
Ağaçkonak, Adıyaman
Battalhüyük, Adıyaman
Bağdere, Adıyaman
Bağlıca, Adıyaman
Bağpınar, Adıyaman
Başpınar, Adıyaman
Bebek, Adıyaman
Bozhüyük, Adıyaman
Boztepe, Adıyaman
Boğazözü, Adıyaman
Börkenek, Adıyaman
Büklüm, Adıyaman
Büyükkavaklı, Adıyaman
Büyükkırıklı, Adıyaman
Damdırmaz, Adıyaman
Dardağan, Adıyaman
Davuthan, Adıyaman
Derinsu, Adıyaman
Dişbudak, Adıyaman
Doyran, Adıyaman
Durak, Adıyaman
Durukaynak, Adıyaman
Ekinci, Adıyaman
Elmacık, Adıyaman
Esence, Adıyaman
Esentepe, Adıyaman
Eskihüsnümansur, Adıyaman
Gökçay, Adıyaman
Gölpınar, Adıyaman
Gözebaşı, Adıyaman
Gümüşkaya, Adıyaman
Güneşli, Adıyaman
Güzelyurt, Adıyaman
Hacıhalil, Adıyaman
Hasancık, Adıyaman
Hasankendi, Adıyaman
Karaağaç, Adıyaman
Karagöl, Adıyaman
Karahöyük, Adıyaman
Karakoç, Adıyaman
Kavak, Adıyaman
Kayacık, Adıyaman
Kayatepe, Adıyaman
Kayaönü, Adıyaman
Kaşköy, Adıyaman
Kemerkaya, Adıyaman
Koruköy, Adıyaman
Kozan, Adıyaman
Koçali, Adıyaman
Kuyucak, Adıyaman
Kuşakkaya, Adıyaman
Kömür, Adıyaman
Kındırali, Adıyaman
Kızılcahöyük, Adıyaman
Kızılcapınar, Adıyaman
Mestan, Adıyaman
Narince, Adıyaman
Olgunlar, Adıyaman
Oluklu, Adıyaman
Ormaniçi, Adıyaman
Palanlı, Adıyaman
Payamlı, Adıyaman
Paşamezrası, Adıyaman
Pınaryayla, Adıyaman
Sarıharman, Adıyaman
Sarıkaya, Adıyaman
Taşgedik, Adıyaman
Taşpınar, Adıyaman
Tekpınar, Adıyaman
Toptepe, Adıyaman
Uludam, Adıyaman
Uzunköy, Adıyaman
Uzunpınar, Adıyaman
Uğurca, Adıyaman
Yarmakaya, Adıyaman
Yayladamı, Adıyaman
Yaylakonak, Adıyaman
Yazlık, Adıyaman
Yazıbaşı, Adıyaman
Yazıca, Adıyaman
Yedioluk, Adıyaman
Yenice, Adıyaman
Yenigüven, Adıyaman
Yeniköy, Adıyaman
Yeşilova, Adıyaman
Yeşiltepe, Adıyaman
Ziyaretpayamlı, Adıyaman
Çamgazi, Adıyaman
Çamlıca, Adıyaman
Çamyurdu, Adıyaman
Çatalağaç, Adıyaman
Çaylı, Adıyaman
Çayırlı, Adıyaman
Çemberlitaş, Adıyaman
Çobandede, Adıyaman
İncebağ, Adıyaman
İnceler, Adıyaman
İndere, Adıyaman
Şerefli, Adıyaman

Besni

Akkuyu, Besni
Akpınar, Besni
Aktepe, Besni
Akyazı, Besni
Alişar, Besni
Alıçlı, Besni
Atmalı, Besni
Aşağısöğütlü, Besni
Aşağıçöplü, Besni
Başlı, Besni
Bereketli, Besni
Besni
Beşkoz, Besni
Beşyol, Besni
Boncuk, Besni
Burunçayır, Besni
Dikilitaş, Besni
Dogankaya, Besni
Dörtyol, Besni
Eğerli, Besni
Geçitli, Besni
Gümüşlü, Besni
Güneykaş, Besni
Güzelyurt, Besni
Hacıhalil, Besni
Harmanardı, Besni
Hasanlı, Besni
Karagüveç, Besni
Karalar, Besni
Kargalı, Besni
Kesecik, Besni
Kesmetepe, Besni
Konuklu, Besni
Kurugöl, Besni
Kutluca, Besni
Kuzevleri, Besni
Köseceli, Besni
Kızılhisar, Besni
Kızılin, Besni
Kızılkaya, Besni
Kızılpınar, Besni
Oyalı, Besni
Oyratlı, Besni
Pınarbaşı, Besni
Sarıkaya, Besni
Sarıyaprak, Besni
Sayören, Besni
Sugözü, Besni
Suvarlı, Besni
Taşlıyazı, Besni
Tekağaç, Besni
Tokar, Besni
Toklu, Besni
Topkapı, Besni
Uzunkuyu, Besni
Yazıbeydilli, Besni
Yazıkarakuyu, Besni
Yelbastı, Besni
Yeniköy, Besni
Yoldüzü, Besni
Yukarısöğütlü, Besni
Çakırhüyük, Besni
Çamlıca, Besni
Çamuşçu, Besni
Çaykaya, Besni
Çilboğaz, Besni
Çomak, Besni
Çorak, Besni
Ören, Besni
Üçgöz, Besni
Şambayat, Besni

Gerger

Açma, Gerger
Ağaçlı, Gerger
Aşağıdağlıca, Gerger
Beybostan, Gerger
Beşgöze, Gerger
Budaklı, Gerger
Burçaklı, Gerger
Cevizpınar, Gerger
Dallarca, Gerger
Dağdeviren, Gerger
Demirtaş, Gerger
Eskikent, Gerger
Gerger
Geçitli, Gerger
Gölyurt, Gerger
Gönen, Gerger
Gözpınar, Gerger
Gümüşkaşık, Gerger
Gündoğdu, Gerger
Güngörmüş, Gerger
Gürgenli, Gerger
Güzelsu, Gerger
Kaşyazı, Gerger
Kesertaş, Gerger
Konacık, Gerger
Korulu, Gerger
Koşarlar, Gerger
Köklüce, Gerger
Kütüklü, Gerger
Kılıç, Gerger
Nakışlı, Gerger
Onevler, Gerger
Ortaca, Gerger
Oymaklı, Gerger
Saraycık, Gerger
Seyitmahmut, Gerger
Sutepe, Gerger
Yayladalı, Gerger
Yağmurlu, Gerger
Yenibardak, Gerger
Yeşilyurt, Gerger
Yukarıdağlıca, Gerger
Çamiçi, Gerger
Çifthisar, Gerger
Çobanpınarı, Gerger
Üçkaya, Gerger

Gölbaşı 

Aktoprak, Gölbaşı
Akçabel, Gölbaşı
Akçakaya, Gölbaşı
Aşağıazaplı, Gölbaşı
Aşağıkarakuyu, Gölbaşı
Aşağınasırlı, Gölbaşı
Bağlarbaşı, Gölbaşı
Belkar, Gölbaşı
Belören, Gölbaşı
Cankara, Gölbaşı
Gedikli, Gölbaşı
Gölbaşı, Adıyaman
Hacılar, Gölbaşı
Hamzalar, Gölbaşı
Harmanlı, Gölbaşı
Haydarlı, Gölbaşı
Karabahşılı, Gölbaşı
Karaburun, Gölbaşı
Küçükören, Gölbaşı
Meydan, Gölbaşı
Ozan, Gölbaşı
Savran, Gölbaşı
Yarbaşı, Gölbaşı
Yaylacık, Gölbaşı
Yeniköy, Gölbaşı
Yukarıkarakuyu, Gölbaşı
Yukarınasırlı, Gölbaşı
Yukarıçöplü, Gölbaşı
Çatalağaç, Gölbaşı
Çataltepe, Gölbaşı
Çelik, Gölbaşı
Örenli, Gölbaşı

Kahta

Adalı, Kahta
Akalın, Kahta
Akdoğan, Kahta
Akkavak, Kahta
Akpınar, Kahta
Aktaş, Kahta
Akıncılar, Kahta
Alidamı, Kahta
Arılı, Kahta
Aydınpınar, Kahta
Ballı, Kahta
Bağbaşı, Kahta
Belenli, Kahta
Belören, Kahta
Beşikli, Kahta
Bostanlı, Kahta
Bozpınar, Kahta
Boztarla, Kahta
Boğazkaya, Kahta
Burmapınar, Kahta
Bölükyayla, Kahta
Büyükbağ, Kahta
Büyükbey, Kahta
Damlacık, Kahta
Dardağan, Kahta
Doluca, Kahta
Dumlu, Kahta
Dutköy, Kahta
Eceler, Kahta
Ekinci, Kahta
Erikdere, Kahta
Erikli, Kahta
Fındıklıçalı, Kahta
Fıstıklı, Kahta
Geldibuldu, Kahta
Gökçe, Kahta
Gölgeli, Kahta
Göçeri, Kahta
Güdülge, Kahta
Güzelçay, Kahta
Habipler, Kahta
Hacıyusuf, Kahta
Hasköy, Kahta
Karacaören, Kahta
Karadut, Kahta
Kavaklı, Kahta
Kayadibi, Kahta
Kocahisar, Kahta
Kozağaç, Kahta
Koçtepe, Kahta
Kâhta
Köseler, Kahta
Menzil, Kahta
Mülkköy, Kahta
Narince, Kahta
Narsırtı, Kahta
Oluklu, Kahta
Ortanca, Kahta
Ovacık, Kahta
Salkımbağı, Kahta
Sarısu, Kahta
Susuz, Kahta
Sıraca, Kahta
Sırakaya, Kahta
Taşlıca, Kahta
Teğmenli, Kahta
Tuğlu, Kahta
Tütenocak, Kahta
Ulupınar, Kahta
Yapraklı, Kahta
Yelkovan, Kahta
Yenikuşak, Kahta
Yolaltı, Kahta
Zeytinköy, Kahta
Ziyaret, Kahta
Çakıreşme, Kahta
Çaltılı, Kahta
Çardak, Kahta
Çataltepe, Kahta
Çaybaşı, Kahta
Çukurtaş, Kahta
Çıralık, Kahta
İkizce, Kahta
İslamköy, Kahta
Şahintepe, Kahta

Samsat

Akdamar, Samsat
Bayırlı, Samsat
Bağarası, Samsat
Doğanca, Samsat
Göltarla, Samsat
Gülpınar, Samsat
Kovanoluk, Samsat
Kuştepe, Samsat
Kırmacık, Samsat
Kızılöz, Samsat
Ovacık, Samsat
Samsat
Taşkuyu, Samsat
Tepeönü, Samsat
Uzuntepe, Samsat
Yarımbağ, Samsat
Çiçekköy, Samsat

Sincik

Aksu, Sincik
Alancık, Sincik
Arıkonak, Sincik
Balkaya, Sincik
Dilektepe, Sincik
Eskiköy, Sincik
Geçitli, Sincik
Hasanlı, Sincik
Hüseyinli, Sincik
Karaköse, Sincik
Kıran, Sincik
Narlı, Sincik
Sakız, Sincik
Serince, Sincik
Serindere, Sincik
Sincik
Subaşı, Sincik
Söğütlübahçe, Sincik
Taşkale, Sincik
Yarpuzlu, Sincik
Çamdere, Sincik
Çat, Sincik
Çatbahçe, Sincik
İnlice, Sincik
Şahinbeyler, Sincik
Şahkolu, Sincik

Tut

Akçatepe, Tut
Boyundere, Tut
Elçiler, Tut
Havutlu, Tut
Kaşlıca, Tut
Köseli, Tut
Meryemuşağı, Tut
Tepecik, Tut
Tut
Yalankoz, Tut
Yaylımlı, Tut
Yeşilyurt, Tut
Çiftlik, Tut
Öğütlü, Tut
Ünlüce, Tut

Çelikhan

Aksu, Çelikhan
Altıntaş, Çelikhan
Bozgedik, Çelikhan
Gölbağı, Çelikhan
Kalecik, Çelikhan
Karagöl, Çelikhan
Karaçayır, Çelikhan
Korucak, Çelikhan
Köseuşağı, Çelikhan
Mutlu, Çelikhan
Pınarbaşı, Çelikhan
Recepköy, Çelikhan
Taşdamlar, Çelikhan
Yağızatlı, Çelikhan
Yeşiltepe, Çelikhan
Yeşilyayla, Çelikhan
Çampınar, Çelikhan
Çelikhan
İzci, Çelikhan

External links
Turkstat

Adiyaman
List